In the Chicago mayoral election of 1935, incumbent Interim Mayor Edward J. Kelly (who had been appointed to office of mayor after the assassination of Anton Cermak) defeated Republican Emil C. Wetten and independent candidate Newton Jenkins by a landslide 60% margin of victory.

Both major parties held primary elections to select their nominees. In the Democratic Party primary, Interim Mayor Kelly won a massive majority over three opponents, winning 88.92% of the overall vote. In the Republican primary, Wetten won a sizable majority against two opponents. Businessman Mortimer B. Flynn was the strongest of his opponents. The second opponent, Grace Gray, was the first woman to ever file as a candidate for mayor of Chicago.

Nominations

Democratic primary
Interim mayor Edward J. Kelly ran for election to a full first term. He had been appointed as interim mayor by the Chicago City Council following the death in office of Anton Cermak and subsequent resignation of acting mayor Frank J. Corr.

Results
Despite a blizzard, a substantial number of Chicago voters participated in the Democratic mayoral primary. Edward J. Kelly won what was the greatest plurality ever in a Chicago mayoral primary.

Republican primary
The Republican primary was won by Emil C. Wetten. Wetten was an attorney that had served in such roles as first assistant corporation counsel for the city.

Mortimer B. Flynn had been president of the Pottinger-Flynn Coal Company.

Unsuccessful candidate Grace A. Gray was the first woman ever to file as a candidate for mayor of Chicago.

The primary illustrated a collapse in Chicagoans' support for the Republican Party. In the previous election, more than five times as many voters had participated in the Republican primary.

Results

Independent candidate
Newton Jenkins, an attorney, ran as an independent candidate. Jenkins promoted himself as a "progressive" candidate. 

Jenkins had run for office before. He first ran for alderman of the 27th Ward in 1920. He ran in the Republican primary of the 1924 United States Senate election in Illinois on a Robert La Follette-aligned platform. During the 1930 Illinois U.S. Senate race he had been one of several candidates challenging incumbent Charles S. Deneen for the Republican Party nomination. Ultimately, Ruth Hanna McCormick had received the Republican nomination. He again ran unsuccessfully in the Republican primary of the 1932 United States Senate election in Illinois.

Jenkins was very openly antisemitic.

Jenkins' run was supported by the Third Party, an effort to create a new party. The party claimed itself to be spun-off from the progressive Republican movement. The party, which intended to use "U.S., Unite" as its national slogan and utilize the buffalo as its mascot, sought to use Jenkins' candidacy as a national launchpad for the party. This effort ultimately evolved into the short-lived Union Party, on which party line Jenkins would go on to run unsuccessfully for U.S. Senate in 1936.

General election
Wetten framed his campaign against Kelly as a campaign against machine politics. Wetten was a rather weak opponent.

Results

Kelly received 84.84% of the Polish-American vote, while Wetten received 8.08%.

Aftermath
Kelly would go on to win reelection twice. In 1947, he would forgo seeking a fourth term after being urged to step aside by the Cook County Democratic Party, which had been concerned about the prospect of Kelly losing a general election due to scandals which had plagued him during his fourteen years as mayor. 

This was the first Chicago mayoral election won by a candidate hailing from the Bridgeport neighborhood of Chicago. Over the subsequent decades, Bridgeport would come to generate several additional mayors, with Martin Kennelly, Richard J. Daley, Michael A. Bilandic, and Richard M. Daley all hailing from the neighborhood.

References

Mayoral elections in Chicago
Chicago
Chicago
20th century in Chicago
1930s in Chicago